Stuart Graham Steven Gorrell (September 17, 1901 – August 10, 1963) was best known for writing the lyrics for the song "Georgia on My Mind".

Born in Knox, Indiana, Gorrell attended Indiana University; there he became friends with fellow student Hoagy Carmichael. After hearing Carmichael play the newly composed melody at a party, Gorrell stayed up all night with Carmichael working on the song and ended up writing lyrics for it.

Gorrell became a banker and never wrote another lyric in his life.

References

Sources
Allmusic

External links
 
 

Indiana University alumni
American male songwriters
American male composers
1963 deaths
1901 births
People from Knox, Indiana
Songwriters from Indiana
20th-century American composers
20th-century American male musicians